Camilla Nilsson (born 3 August 1967 in Östersund, Sweden) is a Swedish female former alpine skier who competed at the 1988 Winter Olympics.

Career
During his career he has achieved 26 results among the top 10 (2 podiums) in the World Cup. On 4 January 1987, she won a women's slalom skiing competition during FIS Alpine Skiing World Cup competitions at Maribor in Slovenia, Yugoslavia, making her the first Swedish woman to win a FIS Alpine Skiing World Cup competition.

World Cup competition victories

References

External links
 
 

1967 births
Swedish female alpine skiers
Alpine skiers at the 1988 Winter Olympics
Olympic alpine skiers of Sweden
People from Östersund
Living people
Sportspeople from Jämtland County